Franco Adrián Toloza (born 9 May 1994) is an Argentine professional footballer who plays as a forward for Temperley, on loan from Colegiales.

Career
Tristán Suárez were Toloza's first senior team. He made his senior debut on 11 May 2013 in a Primera B Metropolitana fixture with Deportivo Morón, which was followed by another appearance versus Acassuso later that month. After just one cameo league appearance in the subsequent 2013–14, Toloza left after he was loaned in June 2014 to Primera C Metropolitana's Argentino. One goal in seven fixtures followed. He returned to Tristán Suárez in 2015, going on to participate sixteen times in the next three seasons. Having spent 2017–18 on loan with Germinal, where he scored four in nine, Toloza signed for Colegiales on 9 July 2018.

In November 2019, after eighteen goals for Colegiales, Toloza joined Primera B Nacional side Ferro Carril Oeste on loan for one year; as an injury replacement for Lucas Pugh. Toloza left Ferro at the end of 2021 and in January 2022, he went on a new loan spell, this time at Temperley for one year.

Career statistics
.

References

External links

1994 births
Living people
Footballers from Buenos Aires
Argentine footballers
Association football forwards
Primera B Metropolitana players
Primera C Metropolitana players
Primera Nacional players
CSyD Tristán Suárez footballers
Argentino de Quilmes players
Club Atlético Colegiales (Argentina) players
Ferro Carril Oeste footballers
Club Atlético Temperley footballers